Caroline Islands Air is a charted air carrier based in the Caroline Islands.

Founded in 1995 as Caroline Pacific Air and renamed in 1997.

Destinations

 Pohnpei International Airport – former base 1995–2020
 Yap International Airport – base 2020–present
 Woleai Airfield - airfield closed 
 Chuuk International Airport
 Fais Airfield
 Houk Airfield
 Onoun Airfield
 Mortlock Islands Airfield (Ta Village) 
 Ulithi

Fleet

 2 Britten-Norman BN-2 Islander –; both damaged in accidents in 2019 and 2020
 1 Beechcraft 65 Queen Air
 1 Harbin Y-12

References

Caroline Islands
Airlines established in 1995
Airlines of the Federated States of Micronesia